Sofronio Palahang (born 22 September 1967), also known as Camoy Palahang, is a Filipino former professional tennis player. He featured on the professional tennis tour in the 1990s.

Palahang appeared in eight Davis Cup ties for the Philippines, which included a 1991 World Group qualifier against Sweden. In his final Davis Cup appearance in 1996 he achieved the only singles win of his career, over Taiwanese player Chen Chih-jung in five sets. He won six Southeast Asian Games medals representing the Philippines and also competed at the Asian Games.

References

External links
 
 
 

1967 births
Living people
Filipino male tennis players
Tennis players at the 1994 Asian Games
Asian Games competitors for the Philippines
Southeast Asian Games medalists in tennis
Southeast Asian Games gold medalists for the Philippines
Southeast Asian Games silver medalists for the Philippines
Southeast Asian Games bronze medalists for the Philippines
Competitors at the 1991 Southeast Asian Games
Competitors at the 1993 Southeast Asian Games
Competitors at the 1995 Southeast Asian Games